The Menere River is a river of Grenada, North America.

See also
List of rivers of Grenada

References
 GEOnet Names Server
Grenada map

Rivers of Grenada